The 2008 Duramed Futures Tour was a series of professional women's golf tournaments held from March through October 2008 in the United States. The Futures Tour is the second-tier women's professional golf tour in the United States and is the "official developmental tour" of the LPGA Tour.

Leading money winners
The top ten money winners at the end of the season gained membership on the LPGA Tour for the 2009 season, with those finishing in the top five positions gaining higher priority for entry into events than those finishing in positions six through ten. Finishers in positions six through ten had the option to attend LPGA Qualifying School to try to improve their membership status for 2009.

Schedule and results
The number in parentheses after winners' names show the player's total number of official money, individual event wins on the Futures Tour including that event.

Tournaments in bold are majors

See also
2008 in golf

References

External links
Official site

2008
Futures